Luigi Ferrando (Dom Luís; born January 22, 1941) is the emeritus bishop of the Roman Catholic Diocese of Bragança do Pará.

Biography
Ferrando was born in Agazzano, in the Province of Piacenza. He was ordained priest on May 1, 1965, by the auxiliary bishop of the Roman Catholic Diocese of San Miniato Paolo Ghizzoni.

On May 5, 1996, Ferrando received episcopal ordination of Bragança do Pará from cardinal Ersilio Tonini. He replaced the previous bishop of Bragança Miguel Maria Giambelli; he was the first non-Barnabite bishop of Bragança from its elevation.

Ferrando retired on 17 August 2016.

Awards
Ferrando received the "Antonino d'oro" of the Province of Piacenza.

Notes

Resources
 Profile of Mons. Ferrando www.catholic-hierarchy.org

1941 births
Living people
People from the Province of Piacenza
Italian Roman Catholic bishops in South America
20th-century Roman Catholic bishops in Brazil
Roman Catholic bishops of Bragança do Pará